Weston is a village in West Northamptonshire, England. Together with neighbouring Weedon Lois (also known as Lois Weedon) it forms the civil parish of Weston and Weedon, which had a population of 960 at the 2011 Census.

Weston gives its name to Weston Hall, the home of writer Sir Sacheverell Sitwell from 1927 until his death in 1988.

References

External links

Villages in Northamptonshire
West Northamptonshire District